Merlin is an unincorporated community and census-designated place (CDP) in Josephine County, Oregon, United States. As of the 2010 census it had a population of 1,615. The area is known for sport fishing and whitewater rafting on the Rogue River. Merlin's ZIP code is 97532.

A new railroad station in this location in 1883 was called "Jump Off Joe" for a local stream. The station was renamed "Merlin" in October 1886. The name came from a railroad civil engineer who named it for the merlins (a type of falcon) he saw in the area. "McAllister" post office was established about a mile north of Merlin in 1885, then moved to the vicinity of the railroad station and renamed Merlin in 1891.

Geography 

Demographics

References

1883 establishments in Oregon
Populated places established in 1883
Census-designated places in Oregon
Census-designated places in Josephine County, Oregon
Unincorporated communities in Josephine County, Oregon
Unincorporated communities in Oregon